Oxbridge is an area of Stockton-on-Tees within the borough of Stockton-on-Tees and the ceremonial county of County Durham, England.

It is situated to the south-west of the town centre.  In recent times, the area has been known for its high crime rate.  In a 2019 article wrote by TeessideLive, Oxbridge was marked as a "hot spot" for residential burglaries, drug dealing, crime and anti-social behaviour.

References

Oxbridge, Stockton-on-Tees